Vasil Spasov, nicknamed The Roller (30 December 1919 – 16 November 1996) was a Bulgarian football player and manager who played as a forward. He achieved 17 cap (sport)s for his country, scoring five goals.

While he played the majority of his career with Levski Sofia, they won five Bulgarian Championship titles and four Bulgarian cups.

Honours

Player
Levski Sofia
Bulgarian State Championship (1): 1942
Bulgarian Republic Championship (2): 1946, 1947
Bulgarian A Group (2): 1948–49, 1953
Bulgarian Cup (4): 1942, 1946, 1947, 1949
Sofia Championship (5): 1942, 1943, 1945, 1946, 1948
Bulgarian footballer of the Year: 1948

Manager
Botev Plovdiv
Bulgarian A Group: 1966–67

Spartak Sofia
Bulgarian Cup: 1967–68

Omonia
Cypriot First Division (3): 1973–74, 1980–81, 1981–82
Cypriot Cup (3): 1974, 1981, 1982
Cypriot Super Cup (2): 1981, 1982

Levski Sofia
Bulgarian A Group: 1976–77
Bulgarian Cup: 1976–77

References

External links 
Levski Sofia career summary
Maccabi Haifa coaches (in Hebrew)

1919 births
1996 deaths
Bulgarian footballers
Bulgaria international footballers
First Professional Football League (Bulgaria) players
PFC Levski Sofia players
Akademik Sofia players
Bulgarian football managers
PFC Levski Sofia managers
Bulgaria national football team managers
AC Omonia managers
Cyprus national football team managers
Bulgarian expatriate football managers
Footballers from Sofia
Association football forwards